The 23rd Multi-member Constituency is one of the five Bulgarian constituencies whose borders are different from the administrative division. It comprises several regions in South-West and South-East Sofia.

Background
In the 2009 Bulgarian parliamentary election the 23rd Multi-member Constituency – Sofia-23 elected 12 members to the Bulgarian National Assembly: 11 of which were by proportionality vote and 1 was by first-past-the-post voting.

Members in the Bulgarian National Assembly
 Through first-past-the-post voting

 Through proportionality vote

Elections
2009 election

 proportionality vote

 first-past-the-post voting

See also
2009 Bulgarian parliamentary election
Politics of Bulgaria
List of Bulgarian Constituencies

References

Electoral divisions in Bulgaria
Sofia City Province